Uvariopsis tripetala is a species of plant in the Annonaceae family. It is found in Ghana and Nigeria. It is threatened by habitat loss.

References

Annonaceae
Vulnerable plants
Flora of Ghana
Flora of Nigeria
Taxonomy articles created by Polbot